Eero Vasa (born 1 February 1997) is a Finnish tennis player.

Vasa has a career high ATP singles ranking of 601 achieved on 29 July 2019. He also has a career high ATP doubles ranking of 340 achieved on 7 November 2022.

On the junior tour Vasa has a career high ranking of 62 achieved on 19 January 2015.

Vasa has represented Finland in the Davis Cup, where he has a W/L record of 0–2.

External links
 
 
 
 

1997 births
Living people
Finnish male tennis players
Sportspeople from Turku